The Awakening of Jim Burke is a 1935 American drama film directed by Lambert Hillyer and written by Michael L. Simmons. The film stars Jack Holt, Florence Rice, Jimmy Butler, Kathleen Burke, Robert Middlemass and Ralph Remley. The film was released on May 18, 1935, by Columbia Pictures.

Plot

Cast           
Jack Holt as Jim Burke
Florence Rice as Tess Hardie
Jimmy Butler as Jimmy Burke
Kathleen Burke as Laura
Robert Middlemass as Bill Duke
Ralph Remley as Blink
Wyrley Birch as Lem Hardie
George McKay as Fly Speck Sam

References

External links
 

1935 films
American drama films
1935 drama films
Columbia Pictures films
Films directed by Lambert Hillyer
American black-and-white films
1930s English-language films
1930s American films